Parotis incurvata is a moth in the family Crambidae. It was described by William Warren in 1896. It is found in Indonesia (Java), on the Loyalty Islands and in Australia, where it has been recorded from Queensland and New South Wales.

References

Moths described in 1896
Spilomelinae